Dainius Virbickas (born 12 November 1971) is a retired Lithuanian long-distance runner.

He competed in the men's marathon event at the 1996 Summer Olympics in Atlanta, Georgia, where he didn't reach the finish line. The other two competitors for Lithuania in this event were Pavelas Fedorenka (70th place) and Česlovas Kundrotas, who also did not finish. His personal best was 2:15.28 hours, achieved in 1995.

References

1971 births
Living people
Lithuanian male long-distance runners
Athletes (track and field) at the 1996 Summer Olympics
Olympic athletes of Lithuania
Olympic male marathon runners